Comcast, the parent company of NBCUniversal, has owned and operated several animation studios since the company acquired NBCUniversal (formed on August 2, 2004) in 2011 and took complete control by 2013.

Its flagship feature animation studio, Universal Animation Studios through Universal Pictures, outputs television, direct-to-video, and animated feature film releases. Currently, Comcast also operates Illumination and DreamWorks Animation as part of the Universal Filmed Entertainment Group. This article does not include other animation studios whose films were released by only Universal Pictures but don't own.

Full list

Current animation studios 
 Universal Animation Studios
 Illumination
 DreamWorks Animation

Divested or defunct animation studios 
 Amblimation – Founded in 1989 by Steven Spielberg, Amblimation was a British animation studio subsidiary of Amblin Entertainment. Within its run, all three of its theatrical films through Universal Pictures. Amblimation is considered the predecessor to DreamWorks Animation.

Universal Filmed Entertainment Group

Universal Animation Studios 

Founded in 1991, Universal Animation Studios (formally Universal Cartoon Studios) is the primary animation division of Universal Pictures.

DreamWorks Animation LLC

DreamWorks Animation Television

DreamWorks Classics/Classic Media

Harvey Entertainment

Bullwinkle Studios

Illumination

Illumination Studios Paris

Walter Lantz Productions

Amblimation 

Amblimation was a British animation studio subsidiary of Amblin Entertainment founded by Steven Spielberg in May 1989. During its run, the studio only produced three feature films, An American Tail: Fievel Goes West (1991), We're Back! A Dinosaur's Story (1993) and Balto (1995), all composed by James Horner and distributed by Universal Pictures. Amblimation's mascot was Fievel Mousekewitz. Before the studio reached a close, its crew members joined DreamWorks Animation (which had been co-founded by Spielberg in 1994), and it closed in 1997.

Notes

References

Universal Animation Studios
DreamWorks Animation
Illumination (company)
Universal Pictures
Animation studios
Comcast subsidiaries